Pedalling Ice Field is an icefield composed of blue ice, located at the edge of the polar plateau just south of Mount Dewitt and Mount Littlepage, close to the boundary between Oates Land and Victoria Land. The name alludes to the use of a bicycle as a practical means of transportation by a glacial mapping party led by Trevor Chinn, summer season 1992–93, and is part of a theme of cycling names in the area. Approved by New Zealand Geographic Board (NZGB) in 1995.

References

Ice fields of Antarctica
Bodies of ice of Oates Land